The Middle Branch of the Mad River is a  mountain brook on the Maine-New Hampshire border in the United States, within the eastern White Mountains. It is a tributary of the Mad River, a short feeder of the Cold River, part of the Saco River watershed.

The Middle Branch flows east off the slopes of West Royce Mountain, beginning in New Hampshire and finishing in Maine. It joins the Mad River just upstream of Mad River Falls near the foot of the mountain.

See also

List of rivers of New Hampshire

References

Rivers of Maine
Rivers of New Hampshire
Saco River
Rivers of Knox County, Maine